The Guáitara River is a river of Colombia. It is a tributary of the Patía River.

Course

The Guáitara River rises on the border of Ecuador and Colombia on the slopes of Chiles Volcano and initially flows east, eventually turning north to join the Patia. It is called the Carchi River in Ecuador.  

In its lower reaches the river is in the Patía Valley dry forests ecoregion.

See also
List of rivers of Colombia

References

Rivers of Colombia